The 1st Golden Rooster Award honoring the best in mainland film of 1981. Award ceremony held in Hangzhou, Zhejiang Province, May 22, 1981.

Winners and Nominees

Special Award 
Special Jury Award
Film: Miao Miao
Voice Actor: Xiang Junshu

References

External links 
 The 1st Golden Rooster Award

198
Golden Rooster Awards 
Golden Rooster Awards 
Golden Rooster Awards, 1st
Golden Rooster Awards